Beckwith may refer to

Places 
 Beckwith, North Yorkshire, England, United Kingdom
 Beckwith, Ontario, township in eastern Ontario, Canada
 Beckwith, California, former name of Beckwourth, California, United States
 Beckwith, West Virginia, United States

People 
 Beckwith baronets, an English title from 1681 to 1796
 Abijah Beckwith (New York politician) (1785–1874), New York politician
 Abijah Beckwith (Wisconsin politician) (1843–1897), Wisconsin politician
 Andrew Beckwith (born 1995), American baseball player
 Asahel C. Beckwith (1827–1896), Wyoming senator
 Athelstan Beckwith (1930–2010), Australian chemist
 Carol Beckwith, photographer
 Charles Beckwith (disambiguation)
 Christopher Beckwith (born 1945), American linguist and historian
 Clarence Beckwith (1849–1931), American theologian
 Cora Jipson Beckwith (1875–1955), American zoologist
 Corydon Beckwith (1823–1890), American jurist and lawyer
 Darry Beckwith (born 1987), American footballer
 Dean Beckwith (born 1983), English footballer
 Denise Beckwith (born 1977), Australian swimmer 
 Edward Griffin Beckwith (1818–1881), conducted one of the Pacific Railroad Surveys
 Emma Beckwith (1849–1919), American suffragette, bookkeeper, optician and inventor
 Francis J. Beckwith (born 1960), legal scholar 
 Frank R. Beckwith (1904–1965), American lawyer and civil rights activist
 Henry L. P. Beckwith Jr. (born 1935), American author 
 Holmes Beckwith, American political scientist
 George Beckwith (British Army officer) (1753–1823)
 George Beckwith (Carl Jung associate) (1896–1931), American patient and associate of Carl Jung
 Gladys Beckwith (1929–2020), American women's studies academic
 Holmes Beckwith (1884–1921), American academic 
 James Carroll Beckwith (1852–1917), American portrait painter.
 James Roswell Beckwith, US Attorney in New Orleans, prosecuted perpetrators of the Colfax Massacre (1873)
 James R. Beckwith (1857–1935), American politician
 James P. Beckwith, better known as James Beckwourth (1800−1866), trapper, Indian chief, fur trader, scout
 Jefferson H. Beckwith (1813–1865), American politician
 Joe Beckwith (1955–2021), American baseball player
 John Beckwith (disambiguation)
 Jon Beckwith (born 1935), American microbiologist
 Josiah Beckwith (born 1734), English antiquary
 Julia Catherine Beckwith (1796–1867), Canadian novelist
 Kendell Beckwith (born 1994), American football player
 Lillian Beckwith, English author
 Mark M. Beckwith, American bishop
 Martha Warren Beckwith (1871–1959), American folklorist
 Mary Lincoln Beckwith (1898–1975), great-granddaughter of Abraham Lincoln
 Mayhew Beckwith (1798–1871), Canadian merchant and politician
 Michael Beckwith, New Thought minister
 Naomi Beckwith (born 1976), American curator
 Reginald Beckwith (1908–1965), English actor
 Robert Todd Lincoln Beckwith (1904–1985), great-grandson of Abraham Lincoln
 Sandra Beckwith (born 1943), American judge
 Stephen Beckwith (born 1623), founding settler of Norwalk, Connecticut
 Tamara Beckwith (born 1970), English socialite
 Thomas Beckwith (1731–1786), English painter 
 Thomas Sydney Beckwith (1775–1831), British army officer
 Wally Beckwith (1893–1983), Australian runner and footballer
 Warren Wallace Beckwith, Lincoln family member
 William Beckwith (1795–1871), English Army officer

Other uses 
 Beckwith Company, American book publisher
 Beckwith Island, Ontario, Canada

See also 
 Byron De La Beckwith, American murderer of Medgar Evers
 Beckworth, a surname

English-language surnames